The Stranger is an alternative biweekly newspaper in Seattle, Washington, U.S. The paper's principal competitor is The Seattle Weekly, owned by Sound Publishing, Inc.

History
The Stranger was founded in July 1991 by Tim Keck, who had previously co-founded the satirical newspaper The Onion, and cartoonist James Sturm. Its first issue was produced out of a home in Seattle's Wallingford neighborhood and was released on September 23, 1991. In 1993, The Stranger relocated to Seattle's Capitol Hill district, where its offices remained until 2020. The Stranger's tagline is "Seattle's Only Newspaper". It was chosen to express the newspaper's disdain for Seattle's then two dailies (the Seattle Times and the now-defunct print edition of the Seattle Post-Intelligencer) and The Strangers main alternative rival, the Seattle Weekly. The newspaper regularly covers Seattle City Council politics.

In its early days, The Stranger had a print run of 20,000, and focused on Seattle's University District. It was originally distributed as a single sheet of newsprint wrapped around a wad of coupons redeemable at local businesses.

On April 16, 2012, The Stranger won its first Pulitzer Prize. Eli Sanders was awarded a Pulitzer in the Feature Writing category for "The Bravest Woman in Seattle", which the citation describes as "a haunting story of a woman who survived a brutal attack that took the life of her partner, using the woman’s brave courtroom testimony and the details of the crime to construct a moving narrative." The feature appeared in the June 15, 2011, edition.

The Stranger made the transition to a biweekly magazine-style format with its September 27, 2017, issue. The paper was distributed to local businesses, newsstands, and newspaper boxes free of charge every other Wednesday. The offices of The Stranger moved from Capitol Hill to Seattle's Chinatown–International District in 2020. After publishing Volume 29, Number 15 (March 11–24, 2020 Edition) The Stranger ceased publishing a print edition and subsequently removed their newspaper boxes from the streets of Seattle.

In response to the COVID-19 pandemic, on March 13, 2020, The Stranger announced that, due to a dramatic decrease in income from loss of advertising revenue, it would suspend its print edition. COVID-19 triggered The Stranger to lay off eighteen of its employees, which reduced its writing department. A successful online fundraiser was then organized to keep The Stranger afloat.

Notable contributors

Editors
Dan Savage was the Stranger's editor-in-chief from 4 April 2001 to September 2007. Savage, an associate editor since the paper's founding, made his name writing the paper's sarcastic and sometimes inflammatory sex advice column, titled "Savage Love", which has since appeared in every issue of The Stranger. 

In September 2007, Savage became the paper's editorial director and was replaced as editor-in-chief by then-27-year-old Christopher Frizzelle, formerly the Books Editor (in 2003) and Arts Editor (from 2004 to 2007). In July 2016, Frizzelle was replaced by Tricia Romano, a former staff reporter at the Seattle Times and eight-year-long columnist at The Village Voice in New York. 

Romano left the paper in June 2017. The paper does not currently have an editor-in-chief, as Frizzelle now acts as the print editor. 

Chase Burns is the digital editor. The newspaper's current managing editor is Leilani Polk, who replaced Kathleen Richards. The previous managing editor was Bethany Jean Clement, who was formerly the managing editor of Seattle Weekly. Clement's essays in the restaurant section of the newspaper have been anthologized in Best Food Writing 2008 and 2009.

The Stranger's "Police Beat", a weekly column authored by Associate Editor Charles Mudede, has been adapted to an indie film of the same title. Mudede also co-wrote the controversial documentary film, Zoo (2007), about the life and death of Kenneth Pinyan who died in a bestiality incident in Enumclaw, Washington in July 2005. 

The Arts and Music editor is the lead singer of Seattle band Harvey Danger, Sean Nelson—formerly a staff writer and The Stranger's Film Editor—who has profiled the Portland, Oregon band the Decemberists and the pre-teen Seattle band Smoosh when they landed a record deal.

The paper does not currently have a news editor. Previously, the position was held by Steven Hsieh, Eli Sanders, and  Dominic Holden. Prior to the latter was Erica C. Barnett, who, in 2007, was named reporter of the year by Seattle's venerable Municipal League. Barnett left the paper in 2009 to work for news website Publicola.net, founded by former Stranger news editor Josh Feit.

Writers
As of 2020, staff writers include Lester Black, Nathalie Graham, Jasmyne Kiemig, and Dave Segal. 

Previous staffers have included: 
Lindy West 
 actor/monologist David Schmader, who wrote a "news of the week" column called "Last Days"; 
 Emily White, former editor-in-chief, who has authored such books as Fast Girls: Teenage Tribes and the Myth of the Slut, (2002), and You Will Make Money in Your Sleep: The Story of Dana Giacchetto, Financial Adviser to the Stars (2007); 
 Eric Fredericksen, who went on to run the art space Western Bridge;
 novelist Matthew Stadler; 
 Traci Vogel;
 art critic Emily Hall;
 S. P. Miskowski; 
 Everett True; 
 Peri Pakroo; 
 Matt Cook; 
 Jonathan Hart Eddy; 
 Christine Wenc, who edited the paper from 1992 to 1993, during which time the paper was included on Rolling Stone’s Top 10 list for new alternative journalism;
 Danny Housman, music editor (1993–1995); and 
 Phillip Campbell.
Emily Nokes, music editor (2012 - 2015) 

Writers closely associated with the newspaper include Sherman Alexie, Charles D'Ambrosio, Sarah Vowell, Dave Eggers, Jonathan Raban, Heather McHugh, Rebecca Brown, Edmund White, Gary Shteyngart, Miranda July, Tao Lin, Travis Jeppesen, Andrew Sullivan, Stacey Levine, Mistress Matisse, and JT LeRoy.

Writers for the paper in the early 1990s include Inga Muscio, Catholic Activist Thomas E. Byers  and Clark Humphrey. The Stranger won its first ever journalism award in 1995 when contributing writer Lewis Kamb, under News Editor George Howland Jr., exposed the financial shenanigans of Seattle’s chapter of Design Industries Foundation Fighting AIDS (DIFFA).

New York Times Best Seller and 2012 National Book Award Finalist Domingo Martinez, author of The Boy Kings of Texas, worked on staff in the production department from 1993 through 1996 as a production designer, but never wrote for the publication.

Ombudsman
The Stranger ombudsman, A. Birch Steen, wrote acerbic criticism of the paper within every issue, usually assailing the contents for their extreme liberal bias. He was billed as a former member of the OSHA Board of Governors, but was likely a fictional character. The name is an anagram of Steinbacher, after Bradley Steinbacher, the paper's Managing Editor from 2003 until 2008. Steen's harsh critiques originally appeared on the inside of the back page, and later above the table of contents ("The Stranger: A Critical Overview"). He would also be the apparent author of the paper's Twitter feed. Steen died on Monday, April 16, 2012, after suffering a stroke.

Cartoonists
The Stranger has published original comics, illustrations, and graphic art by such notable cartoonists as Tony Millionaire, Peter Bagge, Ellen Forney, Megan Kelso, Al Columbia, Chris Ware, R. Crumb, Jim Woodring, and K. Thor Jensen. In addition, it was the only major Seattle paper to run any of the Jyllands-Posten Muhammad cartoons: four of them were used to illustrate an article by Bruce Bawer about the controversy.

Awards programs

Since 2003, in association with the cigarette company Lucky Strike, and later the antismoking arts organization Art Patch, the newspaper has awarded the annual Stranger Genius Awards to four Seattle-area individuals and one Seattle-area arts organization. Besides the recognition, each winner receives a $5000 cash award and a cake. Winners of the award include the filmmaker James Longley, the filmmaker Lynn Shelton, the writer Sherman Alexie, the poet Heather McHugh, the actress Sarah Rudinoff, the experimental-theater collective Implied Violence, Strawberry Theatre Workshop, the artist Jeffry Mitchell, and the artist Wynne Greenwood. A party and rock show for the winners is held every fall; past Stranger Genius Award parties have been held at the downtown public library, Seattle Art Museum, and the Moore Theater.

Controversies
On the Halloween prior to the 2008 elections the Stranger published a parody in its Topography of Terror series, which included the addresses of homes displaying Republican yard signs. The controversy was then mentioned in a Saturday Night Live sketch about internet conspiracy theories about Democratic intimidation of elderly Republican voters. The Stranger later blacked out the addresses on the online version of its story, after charges of voter intimidation.

See also

The Portland Mercury – The Stranger's sister publication, based out of Portland, Oregon

References

External links

Official website

 
Newspapers published in Seattle
Alternative weekly newspapers published in the United States
Publications established in 1991
1991 establishments in Washington (state)